The CH postcode area, also known as the Chester postcode area, is a group of 37 postcode districts in north-west England and north-east Wales, which are subdivisions of thirteen post towns. These districts cover west Cheshire (including Chester, Neston and Ellesmere Port), The Wirral part of Merseyside (including Birkenhead, Bebington, Heswall, West Kirby, Wallasey and the rest of the Wirral) and east Flintshire (including Deeside, Flint, Buckley, Bagillt, Holywell and Mold).

The postcodes for the Wirral Peninsula were originally covered by the L postcode area, until they were transferred to the CH postcode area in 1999. The postcode numbers were unchanged, so L41 became CH41 and so on.



Coverage
The approximate coverage of the postcode districts:

|-
! CH1
| CHESTER
| Blacon, Chester, Higher Ferry, Capenhurst, Backford
| Cheshire West and Chester, Flintshire
|-
! CH2
| CHESTER
| Backford, Chester, Elton, Hoole, Ince, Mickle Trafford, Moston, Newton by Chester, Upton-by-Chester
| Cheshire West and Chester
|- 
! CH3
| CHESTER
| Boughton, Chester, Huntington, Mouldsworth, Tarvin, Tattenhall, Farndon, Waverton, Saighton, Upton-by-Chester
| Cheshire West and Chester
|-
! CH4
| CHESTER
| Chester, Curzon Park, Handbridge, Lache, Pulford, Penyffordd, Broughton, Saltney
| Cheshire West and Chester, Flintshire
|-
! CH5
| DEESIDE
| Connah's Quay, Shotton, Queensferry, Sealand, Garden City, Sandycroft, Hawarden, Ewloe, Mancot
| Flintshire
|-
!rowspan=2|CH6
| BAGILLT
| Bagillt
|rowspan=2|Flintshire
|-
| FLINT
| Flint, Oakenholt, Flint Mountain
|-
!rowspan=2|CH7
| BUCKLEY
| Buckley
| rowspan=2|Flintshire, Denbighshire
|-
| MOLD
| Mold, Leeswood, Treuddyn, Llanarmon-yn-Ial, Caerwys, Northop Hall
|-
! CH8
| HOLYWELL
| Holywell, Milwr, Holway, Carmel, Lloc, Bryn Celyn, Greenfield, Halkyn, Lixwm, Talacre
| Flintshire
|-
! style="background:#FFFFFF;"|CH25
| style="background:#FFFFFF;"|BIRKENHEAD
| style="background:#FFFFFF;"|PO Boxes
| style="background:#FFFFFF;"|non-geographic
|-
! style="background:#FFFFFF;"|CH26
| style="background:#FFFFFF;"|PRENTON
| style="background:#FFFFFF;"|PO Boxes
| style="background:#FFFFFF;"|non-geographic
|-
! style="background:#FFFFFF;"|CH27
| style="background:#FFFFFF;"|WALLASEY
| style="background:#FFFFFF;"|PO Boxes
| style="background:#FFFFFF;"|non-geographic
|-
! style="background:#FFFFFF;"|CH28
| style="background:#FFFFFF;"|WIRRAL
| style="background:#FFFFFF;"|PO Boxes in Moreton
| style="background:#FFFFFF;"|non-geographic
|-
! style="background:#FFFFFF;"|CH29
| style="background:#FFFFFF;"|WIRRAL
| style="background:#FFFFFF;"|PO Boxes in Hoylake
| style="background:#FFFFFF;"|non-geographic
|-
! style="background:#FFFFFF;"|CH30
| style="background:#FFFFFF;"|WIRRAL
| style="background:#FFFFFF;"|PO Boxes in Upton
| style="background:#FFFFFF;"|non-geographic
|-
! style="background:#FFFFFF;"|CH31
| style="background:#FFFFFF;"|WIRRAL
| style="background:#FFFFFF;"|PO Boxes in Heswall
| style="background:#FFFFFF;"|non-geographic
|-
! style="background:#FFFFFF;"|CH32
| style="background:#FFFFFF;"|WIRRAL
| style="background:#FFFFFF;"|PO Boxes in New Ferry
| style="background:#FFFFFF;"|non-geographic
|-
! style="background:#FFFFFF;"|CH33
| style="background:#FFFFFF;"|NESTON
| style="background:#FFFFFF;"|PO Boxes
| style="background:#FFFFFF;"|non-geographic
|-
! style="background:#FFFFFF;"|CH34
| style="background:#FFFFFF;"|ELLESMERE PORT
| style="background:#FFFFFF;"|PO Boxes
| style="background:#FFFFFF;"|non-geographic
|-
! CH41
| BIRKENHEAD
| Birkenhead, Claughton, Seacombe, Tranmere, Woodside
| Wirral
|-
! CH42
| BIRKENHEAD
| Birkenhead, Oxton, Prenton, Rock Ferry
| Wirral
|-
! CH43
| PRENTON
| Beechwood, Bidston, Noctorum, Oxton, Prenton
| Wirral
|-
! CH44
| WALLASEY
| Egremont, Liscard, Poulton, Seacombe, Wallasey
| Wirral
|-
! CH45
| WALLASEY
| New Brighton, Wallasey, Wallasey Village
| Wirral
|-
! CH46
| WIRRAL
| Leasowe, Moreton, Saughall Massie
| Wirral
|-
! CH47
| WIRRAL
| Hoylake, Meols
| Wirral
|-
! CH48
| WIRRAL
| Caldy, Frankby, Grange, Hoylake, Newton, West Kirby
| Wirral
|-
! CH49
| WIRRAL
| Greasby, Landican, Saughall Massie, Upton, Woodchurch
| Wirral
|-
! CH60
| WIRRAL
|Heswall, Gayton
| Wirral
|-
! CH61
| WIRRAL
| Barnston, Heswall (part), Irby, Pensby, Thingwall, Thurstaston
| Wirral
|-
! CH62
| WIRRAL
| Bromborough, Eastham, New Ferry, Port Sunlight, Spital
| Wirral
|-
! CH63
| WIRRAL
| Brimstage, Bromborough, Clatterbridge, Higher Bebington, Lower Bebington, Raby, Raby Mere, Spital, Storeton, Thornton Hough
| Wirral
|-
! CH64
| NESTON
|Parkgate, Neston, Willaston, Little Neston, Ness, Puddington, Burton
| Cheshire West and Chester
|-
! CH65
| ELLESMERE PORT
| Ellesmere Port, Great Sutton, Whitby, Wolverham
| Cheshire West and Chester
|-
! CH66
| ELLESMERE PORT
| Childer Thornton, Ellesmere Port, Great Sutton, Hooton, Ledsham, Little Sutton, Overpool, Whitby
| Cheshire West and Chester
|-
! style="background:#FFFFFF;"|CH88
| style="background:#FFFFFF;"|CHESTER
| style="background:#FFFFFF;"|North West Securities Bank
| style="background:#FFFFFF;"|non-geographic
|-
! style="background:#FFFFFF;"|CH99
| style="background:#FFFFFF;"|CHESTER
| style="background:#FFFFFF;"|Benefits Agency, St. Michaels Financial Services & Chargecard
| style="background:#FFFFFF;"|non-geographic
|}

Map

See also
List of postcode areas in the United Kingdom
Postcode Address File
GeoNames database

Notes

References

External links
Using Welsh alternative addresses within Royal Mail's Postcode Address File (PAF)
Royal Mail's Postcode Address File
A quick introduction to Royal Mail's Postcode Address File (PAF)

Chester
Postcode areas covering Wales
Postcode areas covering North West England